Beatmania is a music video game and part of the beatmania IIDX series. Designed for the North American market, it was the only beatmania IIDX game released in the region until the arcade release of beatmania IIDX 27 HEROIC VERSE in 2020. It was released by Konami for the PlayStation 2 on March 28, 2006.

Reception

The game received "average" reviews according to the review aggregation website Metacritic.

References

External links 
 

2006 video games
Beatmania games
Multiplayer and single-player video games
North America-exclusive video games
PlayStation 2 games
PlayStation 2-only games
Video games developed in Japan